Swayne may refer to:

people
 Charles Swayne, American judge
 Charles Richard Swayne, British Colonial Service 
 Desmond Swayne (1956-), Conservative politician in the United Kingdom
 Sir Eric John Eagles Swayne (1863-1929), British army officer a colonial administrator
 Geraldine Swayne (1965-), British painter and film maker
 Giles Swayne (1946-), British composer
 Harald George Carlos Swayne (1860-1940), British army officer and writer (brother of Sir Eric Swayne)
 Harry Swayne (1965-), offensive tackle in the NFL
 Kevin Swayne (1975-), American football player
 Noah Haynes Swayne (1804–1884), American jurist and politician, opposed slavery
 Steve Swayne, associate professor of music at Dartmouth College
 Thomas Swayne, 18th century cricketer 
 Wager Swayne (1834-1902), son of Noah Haynes Swayne, Union Army general during the American Civil War
 William Marshall Swayne, sculptor, sculpted a bust of Lincoln 

other uses
 Sweyn Forkbeard
 Senkelle Swayne's Hartebeest Sanctuary, a protected area in the Oromia Region (or kilil) of Ethiopia, dedicated especially to the protection of the Swayne's Hartebeest
 Swayne Hall, Talladega College, a National Historic Landmark
 Swayne Field, named for Noah H. Swayne, Jr., minor league baseball park in Toledo, Ohio